Bollywood Beats is a 2009 Bollywood-inspired dance film written and directed by Mehul Shah. It was produced by Kinetik Films and distributed by Breaking Glass Films.

Plot
Raj (Sachin Bhatt) is an Indian-American choreographer trying to make it in the bustling city of Los Angeles. After being dumped by his girlfriend, bombing another dance audition, and nearly getting kicked out of his parents’ home, Raj's luck changes when he meets Jyoti, (Lilette Dubey), a sexy Indian woman, who suggests for him to teach her and a group of Indian women dance.

While unsuccessful at the start, Raj's class grows with Vincent, (Mehul Shah), a gay teen who wants to dance regardless of what his father thinks, Laxmi, (Pooja Kumar), a South Indian woman new to this country and friendless, Puja, (Mansi Patel) an unenthusiastic high school student, who is being dragged by her grandmother, Vina (Sarita Joshi).

Through it all, the group manages to find family, love, and acceptance where they least expected to.

Cast
 Sachin Bhatt as Raj
 Lilette Dubey as Jyoti
 Pooja Kumar as Laxmi
 Mansi Patel as Puja
 Mehul Shah as Vincent
 Namrata Nagraj as Payal
 Ramesh Chandiramani as Ramesh
 Aarti Chandiramani as Kirti
 Farah White as Elizabeth
 Nishendu Vasavada as Manoj
 Asif Taj as Ram
 Sarita Joshi as Vina

Release

Release
Bollywood Beats travelled internationally to various film festivals, including the Mumbai International Festival, the St. Louis International Film Festival, The Mahindra Indo-American Arts Council Film Festival, Tongues on Fire International Film Festival in London, AFI Film Festival in Dallas, and the Asian Festival of First Films in Singapore.

It is currently being distributed by Breaking Glass Pictures domestically and internationally. The film can be seen on here TV and OUTtv in Canada.

Film Festivals
2009 Mumbai International Film Festival-Official Selection 
2009 AFI Dallas-Official Selection
540 Film Festival in Fayetville, AR-Official Selection
2009 St. Louis International Film Festival-Official Selection
2009 Mahindra Indo-American Film Council Film Festival, New York-Official Selection
2010 Tongues on Fire Film Festival, London-Official Selection
2010 Asian Festival of First Films, Singapore-Official Selection (Best Screenplay Nominee)
2015 Whistler Pride Film Festival, Whistler, Canada

Soundtrack
The soundtrack has music featuring the Indian hip hop group The Bilz ft. Kashif with the tracks "Turn the Music Up," and "Two-Step Bhangra." It also features tracks from London-based Punjabi rapper Hard Kaur, featuring the songs "Sexy Boy" and "Bombay Deewana."  The soundtrack also featured classic Bollywood Tunes such as "O Haseena Zulfowali", "Dum Maro Dum", "Jawani Janeman", "Say Na Say Na", and the title track "Dance all Night" by Indraneel Hariharan and Siddhant Bhatia.

References

External links
 
 

American independent films
Films set in the United States
2009 romantic comedy films
2009 films
American romantic comedy films
2009 independent films
2000s English-language films
2000s American films